Hadley Peak is a peak  high, surmounting the escarpment at the north edge of Ford Massif in the Thiel Mountains of Antarctica. The name was proposed by Peter Bermel and Arthur B. Ford, co-leaders of the United States Geological Survey (USGS) Thiel Mountains party which surveyed these mountains in 1960–61. It was named for Jarvis B. Hadley of the USGS, then Chief of the Branch of Regional Geology in the Eastern United States and administrator of USGS geology programs in Antarctica.

See also
 Mountains in Antarctica

References

Mountains of Ellsworth Land